Zrinski Topolovac is a village and municipality in Bjelovar-Bilogora County, Croatia. In 2011 there were 890 inhabitants, of whom 99.89% were Croats.

History
In the late 19th and early 20th centuries, Zrinski Topolovac was part of the Bjelovar-Križevci County of the Kingdom of Croatia-Slavonia.

On January 1, 1993 it was the site of a shooting in which 10 people died.

References

Municipalities of Croatia
Populated places in Bjelovar-Bilogora County